Model B may refer to:

Aircraft
 Chu Hummingbird Model B, an experimental helicopter
 Funk Model B, a 1930s two-seat cabin monoplane
 Gee Bee Model B, a sports aircraft
 Wright Model B, an early pusher airplane

Land vehicles
 Allis-Chalmers Model B, a tractor 
 Buick Model B, a car
 Cadillac Model B, a car
 Ford Model B (1904), a car
 Ford Model B (1932), a car
 Mack B series, a heavy truck
 Lambretta Model B, a motor scooter

Other uses
 Electro-Spanish Model B, a guitar

See also
 Class B (disambiguation)
 Type B (disambiguation)